Audrey Horne is the third album by Norwegian rock band Audrey Horne, released in 2010. As well as the standard edition, a special limited edition was released containing a bonus CD of acoustic recordings.

Track listing
All tracks written by Audrey Horne except where noted.
"These Vultures" - 1:46
"Charon" - 4:26
"Circus" - 3:33
"Down Like Suicide" - 3:55
"Blaze of Ashes" - 4:44
"Sail Away" - 5:41
"Bridges and Anchors" - 4:36
"Pitch Black Mourning" - 6:15
"Firehose" - 6:06
"Darkdrive" - 5:32
"Godspeed" - 3:34

Bonus disc
"Desert Song" - 3:08
"Carrie" - 3:58
"Bright Lights" - 3:42
"Nowhere to Run" (Paul Stanley) - 4:33
"Rearview Mirror" - 4:02
"Halo" (Ryan Tedder, Evan Bogart, Beyoncé Knowles) - 3:42

Personnel

Audrey Horne
Toschie - vocals
Ice Dale (Arve Isdal) - guitars
Thomas Tofthagen - guitars
Kjetil Greve - drums

Additional Personnel
Espen Lien - bass
Herbrand Larsen - keyboards & percussion
Heidi Marie Vestrheim - vocals
Mike Fasano - drum-tech and lamp on "Down Like Suicide"

Production
Produced, recorded and mixed by Joe Barresi at JHOC, Pasadena, Ca.
Additional production and recording by Herbrand Larsen and Ice Dale at Earshot & Conclave Studios, Bergen, Norway

Charts

References

2010 albums
Audrey Horne (band) albums